Bosnia and Herzegovina competed at the 2022 European Athletics Championships in Munich, Germany, from 15–21 August 2022. Bosnia and Herzegovina was represented by 2 athletes.

Results

Bosnia and Herzegovina entered the following athletes.
 Men 
 Track and road

See also
Bosnia and Herzegovina at the 2022 European Championships

References

Nations at the 2022 European Athletics Championships
2022
European Athletics Championships